"Positive: A Journey Into AIDS" is a 1995 episode of the American television anthology series ABC Afterschool Special, directed by Eamon Harrington and John Watkin. It was produced for the ABC Afterschool Special series. It followed actors Michael Sutton and Kimberly McCullough, who played Stone Cates and Robin Scorpio, respectively, as they researched HIV and AIDS for their roles as HIV+ teenagers on the long-running ABC daytime serial General Hospital.

Cast
 Francesca James, Executive Producer, General Hospital 
 Kimberly McCullough 
 Dr. Steven Miles, President, UCLA School of Medicine 
 Michael Sutton

Awards
1996 Daytime Emmy Awards (2 Wins)
 Outstanding Achievement in Single Camera Editing: Nina Gilberti 
 Outstanding Directing in a Children's Special: John Watkin & Eamon Harrington

References

External links
 

1995 American television episodes
ABC Afterschool Special episodes
HIV/AIDS in television